Yanjin may refer to the following locations:

Yanjin County, Henan, under the administration of Xinxiang, Henan
Yanjin County, Yunnan, under the administration of Zhaotong, Yunnan

See also
Yanjing (disambiguation)
Yanqing (disambiguation)